UCSU may refer to:
 University of Cumbria Students' Union 
 University of Chichester Students' Union